Jarmosht-e Pain (also Romanized as Jarmosht-e Pā‘īn; also known as Char Ḩasht, Garmosht, Jarmasht, Jarmast, and Jarmosht) is a village in Posht Par Rural District, Simakan District, Jahrom County, Fars Province, Iran. At the 2006 census, its population was 229, in 60 families.

References 

Populated places in Jahrom County